The British Academy Television Craft Award for Best Editing: Fiction is one of the categories presented by the British Academy of Film and Television Arts (BAFTA) within the British Academy Television Craft Awards, the craft awards were established in 2000 with their own, separate ceremony as a way to spotlight technical achievements, without being overshadowed by the main production categories.

Before splitting into two categories for editing in 1992, Best Editing: Fiction and Best Editing: Factual (presented from 1992 to 1994 as Best Film or Video Editor – Fiction and Best Film or Video Editor – Factual respectively), two categories were presented to recognize editing in television programming:
 From 1978 to 1991 Best VTR Editor was presented.
 From 1978 to 1991 Best Film Editor was presented.

Winners and nominees

1970s
Best VTR Editor

Best Film Editor

1980s
Best VTR Editor

Best Film Editor

1990s
Best VTR Editor

Best Film Editor

Best Film or Video Editor – Fiction

Best Editing: Fiction

2000s

2010s

2020s

See also
 Primetime Emmy Award for Outstanding Single-Camera Picture Editing for a Comedy Series
 Primetime Emmy Award for Outstanding Single-Camera Picture Editing for a Drama Series
 Primetime Emmy Award for Outstanding Single-Camera Picture Editing for a Limited Series or Movie

References

External links
 

Editing: Fiction